The Jenks baronetcy, of Cheape in the City of London, is a title in the baronetage of the United Kingdom. It was created on 8 October 1932 for Maurice Jenks, Lord Mayor of London from 1931 to 1932.

Jenks baronets, of Cheape (1932)

Sir Maurice Jenks, 1st Baronet (1872–1946)
Sir Richard Atherley Jenks, 2nd Baronet (1906–1993)
Sir Maurice Arthur Brian Jenks, 3rd Baronet (1933–2004)
Sir Richard John Peter Jenks, 4th Baronet (born 1936)

References
Kidd, Charles, Williamson, David (editors). Debrett's Peerage and Baronetage (1990 edition). New York: St Martin's Press, 1990.

External links
www.haberdashers.co.uk
www.burkespeerage.com

Jenks